This is a list of weapons served individually by the United States armed forces. While the general understanding is that crew-served weapons require more than one person to operate them, there are important exceptions in the case of both squad automatic weapons (SAW) and sniper rifles.  Within the Table of Organization and Equipment for both the United States Army and the U.S. Marine Corps, these two classes of weapons are considered as crew-served;  the operator of the weapon has an assistant who carries additional ammunition and associated equipment, acts as a spotter, and is also fully qualified in the operation of the weapon. These weapons are listed under the List of crew-served weapons of the U.S. armed forces.

Bayonets, knives, bayonet-knife models

In active service (some branches or limited roles)
Aircrew Survival Egress Knife (US Army Aircrew and USMC Aircrew)
M9 bayonet (M16 series compatible)
M7 bayonet (M16 series compatible)
M11 knife (EOD)
OKC-3S bayonet (USMC)
Ka-Bar combat knife (USMC)
Gerber Mark II dagger
Mk 3 knife (USN SEALs)
Mission Knives MPK Knife (USN SEALs, USN EOD, and USMC)
Strider SMF (USMC)
SEAL Knife 2000 (USN SEALs)
Tomahawk (VTAC)
Entrenching tool

Out of service (obsolete)
Knife LC-14-B/Type IV Survival Ax (Woodman's Pal)
Marine Corps Raiders stiletto by Camillus
Mk 1 Utility Knife (Navy)
Mk 2 Machete (Navy)
Mk 2 Utility Knife (Marine Corps/Navy)
M1 bayonet (M1 Garand/M1903)
M3 Trench Knife
M4 Bayonet (M1 Carbine)
M5 Bayonet (M1 Garand)
M6 Bayonet (M14)
M1795 Bayonet
M1812 Bay
M1816 Bayonet
M1819 Hall Breech-Loading Rifle Socket Bayonet
M1841 Mississippi Rifle Bayonet
M1847 Musketoon Bayonet
M1849 Rifleman's Knife
M1855 Socket Bayonet
M1861 Navy Rifle Bayonet
M1868 Trowel Bayonet
M1873 Trowel Bayonet
M1880 Hunting Knife (a.k.a. Entrenching knife)
M1887 Hospital Corps Knife
M1898 Bolo Bayonet
M1898 Bowie Bayonet
M1892 Bayonet (Krag)
M1895 Lee Rifle Bayonet
M1904 Hospital Corps Knife
M1905 Bayonet (M1903/M1 Garand)
M1909 Bolo Knife
M1917 Bayonet (M1917 Rifle, M1897, M12 and M1200 Shotguns)
M1917 Bolo Knife
M1917/M1918/Mark I Trench Knife
M1939 Machete
M1942 Bayonet (M1903 Springfield/M1 Garand)
M1942 Bolo Knife (United States Navy Hospital Corpsman)
M1942 Machete
Sykes-Fairbairn Commando Knife
V-42 combat knife (Case V-42 'Stiletto')
V44 Knife

Grenades

In active service
M67 fragmentation grenade
AN/M14 thermite grenade
AN/M8 white smoke grenade
AN/M18 colored smoke grenade
M7A3 CS Gas Grenade
M25A2 Riot Control Grenade
M47 Riot Control Grenade

In active service (some branches or limited roles)
AN/M83 White Smoke Grenade
M84 stun grenade
M116/A1 "Flash Crash"
Mk 141 Mod 0
M100 Grenade Rifle Entry Munition (GREM)
Scalable Offensive Hand Grenade (SOCOM)

Out of service (obsolete)

MK3/3A1/3A2 Concussion Grenade
M25/A1
M7/A1/A2
M6/A1
Mk 1 Mod 0/1/2/3
M34
M16
M15
M8
M33
M61
M26/A1
Mk II/IIA1 (aka Mk 2/2A1) (Frag)
M1 Frangible
Ketchum Grenade (Civil War era)
V40 Mini-Grenade
XM48/E1/E2/E3
XM58
EX 1 Mod 0
EX 2 Mod 0
Model 308-1 (Never standardized)
Kilgore/Schermuly Stun
T13 Beano Grenade
F1 (M1916 Billant Fuse)

Sidearms

In active service
Beretta M9 (9×19mm)
SIG Sauer M11 (P228) (9×19mm)
SIG Sauer M17 Modular Handgun System (P320 Full-Size) (9×19mm) – Was selected by the US Army to replace the M9 after winning the XM17 Modular Handgun System competition
SIG Sauer M18 Modular Handgun System (P320 Carry) (9×19mm) – Was selected by the US Army, Navy, Marines and Air Force to replace the M11 after winning the XM17 Modular Handgun System competition.

In active service (some branches or limited roles)
Beretta M9A1 (9×19mm) (USMC)
Colt M1911A1 (.45 ACP) (as the M45A1 CQBP)
Heckler & Koch P11 (Underwater Pistol) (7.62×36mm rocket-propelled darts) (USSOCOM)
SIG Sauer P229R DAK (.40 S&W) (USCG)
Glock Mk 26 Mod 0 (Glock 26) (9×19mm) (USSOCOM)
Glock Mk 27 Mod 0 (Glock 19) (9×19mm) (USSOCOM)
Glock Mk 28 Mod 0 (Glock 17) (9×19mm) (USSOCOM)
Glock Mk 29 Mod 0 (Glock 34) (9×19mm) (USSOCOM)
M45A1 CQBP (Close Quarters Battle Pistol) (.45 ACP) (USMC)
Heckler & Koch MK 23 Mod 0 (.45 ACP) (USSOCOM)

Out of service (obsolete)
AAI QSPR (Quiet Special Purpose Revolver, .44 Magnum) (never issued)
Beretta 92SB (9×19mm) (JSSAP winner)
Browning Hi-Power (9×19mm) (Special Forces)
Bavarian Model 1842 Musket
Colt Dragoon Revolver (1st/2nd/3rd) (.44)
Colt M1900 (.38 ACP) (never issued)
Colt M1902 (.38 ACP) (never issued)
Colt M1903 (.32 ACP) (General Officers)
Colt M1905 (.45 ACP) (never issued)
Colt M1908 (.380 ACP) (General Officers)
Harpers Ferry Model 1805 (.54)
High Standard HDM (.22 LR) (Navy SEALs and USMC Force Recon)
Kimber ICQB (Interim Close Quarter Battle) (.45 ACP) (MARSOC)
Misc. JSSAP/XM9/XM10 entrants (9×19mm) (never issued)
LeMat Revolver (.41/.63, .35/.5)
M15 General Officers (.45 ACP)
M1799 flintlock pistol (.69)
M1805 Harper's Ferry flintlock pistol (.54)
M1816 flintlock pistol (.54)

M1836 flintlock pistol (.54)
M1842 Navy (.54)
M1842 Pistol (.54)
M1847 Revolver (.44)
M1848 Revolver (.44)
M1849 Pocket Revolver (.31)
M1851 Navy (.36)
M1860 Army Revolver (.44)
M1861 Navy Revolver (.36)
M1873 (.45 Colt)
M1889 Navy (.38 Long Colt)
M1892/M1894/M1896 Army (.38 Long Colt)
M1902 Revolver (.38 Long Colt)
M1900 (DWM "American Eagle Luger"; 7.65×22mm, 9×19mm, .45 ACP) (never issued)
M1903 Army (.38 Special/.38 Long Colt)
M1905 Marine (.38 Long Colt)
M1908 Army (.38 Special)
M1909 Army (.45 Colt)
M1917 (.45 ACP)
Mk 1 Underwater Defense Gun (Mk 59 Mod 0) (Navy SEALs)
Mk 22 Mod 0 (9×19mm Parabellum) (Special Forces)
Objective Personal Defense Weapon (canceled)
Remington-Beals Revolver (.36)
Remington M1858 (.44)
Remington M53 (.45 ACP) (never issued)
Remington M1865/M1867 Navy (.50)
Ruger MK II (.22 LR) (Navy SEALs)
Savage Arms .45 pistol (.45 ACP) (never issued)
Savage Figure Eight (.36)
Schofield Model 3 (.45 Schofield)
Smith & Wesson Model 10 (.38 Special)
Smith & Wesson Model 12 (.38 Special)
Smith & Wesson Model 15 (.38 Special) (USAF)
Smith & Wesson No. 2 (.32)
Spiller and Burr (.36)
Starr Model 1863 (.44)
Steyr Mannlicher M1894 (7.65×21mm) (never issued)

Canceled experiments and competitions
Joint Combat Pistol and related (.45 ACP) (was suspended and later superseded by the XM17 Modular Handgun System competition)
Colt OHWS (.45 ACP) (never issued)
Colt SCAMP (.22 SCAMP) (never issued)
Gyrojet handgun (13mm) (never issued)

Less-lethal

In active service (some branches or limited roles)
FN 303 semi-automatic less-lethal riot gun
M37 MRCD (Mid-size Riot Control Disperser) compressed air weapon

Out of service (obsolete)
M234 Riot Control Launcher

Rifles
Includes muskets, musketoons, etc., as well as rifles

In active service (some branches or limited roles)
XM5 (6.8 Common) (US Army)
M16A4 (5.56×45mm NATO) (USMC, US Army)
M16A3 (5.56×45mm NATO) (Navy SEALs and USN Seabees)
M16A2 (5.56×45mm NATO) (USAF, USCG, and US Army Training/Reserve/National Guard)
 M27 IAR (Infantry Automatic Rifle) (5.56×45mm NATO) (USMC Automatic Rifleman)
 M38 SDMR (Squad Designated Marksman Rifle) (5.56×45mm NATO) (USMC Designated Marksmen)
 Mk 14 EBR (Enhanced Battle Rifle) (7.62×51mm NATO) (USCG, US Army, USAF Designated Marksmen/EOD)
 M39 Enhanced Marksman Rifle (7.62 NATO) (USMC Designated Marksmen/Scout Snipers)
 Mk 11 (KAC SR-25) (7.62×51mm NATO) (USMC, US Army, USAF, USCG, USSOCOM, USN SEALs, Designated Marksmen)
 M110 SASS (7.62x51mm NATO) (SAF Designated Marksmen/EOD)
 M110K1 SASS (7.62x51 NATO, 6.5mm Creedmoor (US Navy Designated Marksman)
 M110A1 CSASS (7.62x51 NATO, 6.5mm Creedmoor (US Army, USMC Designated Marksman)
HK417 (7.62x51mm NATO) (Naval Special Warfare Development Group, USSOCOM))
 SIG Sauer 716 G2  (7.62×51mm NATO) (JSOC)
 Mk 17 Mod 0 (FN SCAR-H) (7.62×51mm NATO) (USSOCOM, USMC Automatic Rifleman)
 Mk 20 Sniper Support Rifle (FN SCAR-H TPR) (7.62x51 NATO, 6.5 Creedmoor) (USSOCOM, USMC Designated Marksmen)
 M24 Sniper Weapon System (Remington Model 700 (7 mm Remington Magnum, .300 Winchester Magnum, .300 Remington Ultra Magnum, and .338 Lapua Magnum) (US Army Designated Marksmen)
 M40 sniper rifle (Remington Model 700 (7 mm Remington Magnum, .300 Winchester Magnum, .300 Remington Ultra Magnum, and .338 Lapua Magnum) (USMC Designated Marksmen, Scout Snipers)
 M2010 Enhanced Sniper Rifle (.300 Winchester Magnum) (US Army)
 Mk 13 Sniper rifle (.300 Winchester Magnum) (SOCOM, USMC, MARSOC)
 Mk 21 Precision Sniper Rifle (Remington Modular Sniper Rifle) (.300 Winchester Magnum .338 Lapua Magnum) (US Army, USMC Designated Marksmen, Scout Snipers)
 Mk 22 Advanced Sniper Rifle (Barret MRAD) (7.62x51 NATO, .300 Norma Magnum, .338 Norma Magnum) (USSOCOM, US Army, USMC) [1]
 M82A1M/A3 (.50 BMG) (US Army)
 M107 (.50 BMG) (USMC Scout Snipers)

Out of service (obsolete)

Semi and fully automatic
FN FAL (battle rifle, trialled as T48 against the T44 and T47 to replace the M1: lost to the former)
Olin/Winchester Salvo Rifle (battle rifle, 5.56mm duplex)
M14E1 (Selective Fire Rifle, 7.62×51mm NATO) (never standardized)
M16A1 (5.56×45mm NATO)
M16 (5.56×45mm NATO)
XM16E1 (5.56×45mm NATO)
M16A2 (5.56×45mm NATO) (USMC)
Heckler & Koch HK33 (Selective Fire Rifle, 5.56×45mm NATO) (Used by the United States Navy Seals during the Vietnam War)
Armalite/Colt Model 601/602 (5.56×45mm NATO rifle) (USAF and SOF use only)
XM22/E1 Rifle (Selective Fire Rifle, 5.56×45mm NATO)
Mk 4 Mod 0 (Suppressed Rifle, 5.56×45mm NATO)
Misc. M1 Garand Variants (E1-E6 and E9-E14) (Semi-Automatic Rifle, .30-06)
Mk 2 Mod 0/1/2 (Semi-Automatic Rifle, 7.62×51mm NATO)
M1 Garand (Semi-automatic rifle, .30-06)
M1941 Johnson rifle (Semi-Automatic Rifle, .30-06)
Model 45A
M1946 rifle (never used in active duty)
M1947 Johnson auto carbine (Semi-Automatic Rifle, .30-06)
Pedersen Rifle (.276) (competed unsuccessfully with M1 Garand to become primary service rifle)
Pedersen Device (attachment for Springfield M1903, .30 conversion)
M1918 BAR (.30-06)
ArmaLite AR-18 (Trial purposes only)
Mk 12 Mod 0/1 Special Purpose Rifle (5.56×45mm NATO) (US Navy, USMC, SOCOM)

Bolt action
M1903/A1/A3 (Bolt-action rifle; .30-03, .30-06)
M1917 Enfield (Bolt-action rifle)
Model 1907/15 Berthier rifle (Bolt-action rifle)
M1895 Navy (Navy Lee, 6 mm Navy)
M1892/M1896/M1898 Rifle (a/k/a Krag Bolt Action Rifle; .30-40 Krag)
M1885 Remington-Lee (Bolt-action rifle; .45-70 Gov)
M1882 Short Rifle (.45-70 Gov.)
M1882 Remington-Lee (Bolt-action rifle; .45-70 Gov.)
M1879 Remington-Lee (Bolt-action rifle; .45-70 Gov.)
Remington–Keene rifle (Bolt-action rifle; .45-70 Gov.)

Breech loading
M1875 Officers' Rifle (.45-70 Gov.)
M1873/M1879/M1880/M1884/M1888/M1889 Springfield (a/k/a Trapdoor Springfield;.45-70 Gov..: .45-55-405 & .45-70-500)
M1872 Springfield (a/k/a Rolling Block Springfield; .50-70 Gov.)
1867 Rolling Block Remington .50-45 centerfire
M1865/M1866/M1868/M1869/M1870 Springfield (a/k/a Trapdoor Springfield and Allin conversions; .50-70 Government)
Sharps carbine/rifle (Breech-loader; .42-60-410) (.52 caliber issued to Berdan's 1st and 2nd US Sharpshooters in the US Civil War)
Burnside Carbine (Breech loader, .54 Burnside, percussion lock) third most common Union cavalry carbine in the US Civil War

Lever action
Henry rifle (Lever-action; .44-26-200)
Spencer rifle (Lever-action; 56-56 (.52-45-350))

Rifled muskets
M1863 Springfield
M1861 Springfield (.58)
Colt revolving rifle (Colt Model 1855; 6/5-shot revolver rifle;.44/.56)
Greene rifle (Bolt-action breech-loader)
P53 Enfield (.577)
P51 Enfield Musketoon ("Artillery Carbine"; 24" barrel, .69)
Model 1854 Lorenz rifle (Rifle-musket, .54, .58)
M1859 Sharps ('New model 1859', breech loader; .52, .56)
M1855 Rifle-Musket
M1855 Rifle (Percussion muzzle-loader; 58-60-500)
M1841 Rifle "Mississippi Rifle" (percussion muzzle-loader;.54, .58)
M1819 Hall rifle (Harper's Ferry;Breech-loader)
Model 1817 Rifle ('Common rifle';Derringer, Johnson, North and Starr; Flintlock rifle, .54) (later percussion)
Model 1814 Common Rifle (Deringer, Johnson; Flintlock rifle; later percussion; .54)
Harper's Ferry Model 1803 Rifle (Flintlock rifle; .54)
1792 contract rifle (Flintlock rifle; .49)
Kentucky Rifle (Flintlock rifle)

Smoothbore muskets
M1847 Musketoon (Springfield, .69)
M1842 Musket (Percussion musket, .69)
M1840 Musket (flintlock musket;.69)(later percussion)
M1835 Springfield (flintlock musket; .69 cal)
Model 1822 Musket (Flintlock Musket) .69 (later percussion)
Model 1816 Musket  (Flintlock musket; .69) (Later Percussion)
Springfield Model 1812 Musket (Flintlock musket; .69)
Model 1808 Contract Musket (Flintlock musket; .69)
Model 1795 Musket (Flintlock musket; .69)
Charleville musket (Flintlock musket; .69)
Brown Bess (Musket; .75)
Ferguson rifle (Flintlock breech-loader; .69)

Experimental
LSAT rifle
NGSW-R (Next Generation Squad Weapon - Rifle) (6.8 Common) (US Army)
Sig Sauer MCX Spear  (.277 Fury) (US Army)
General Dynamics RM277  (True Velocity .277 TVCM polymer-cased cartridge) (US Army)
Desert Tech MDRx  (PCP Ammunition 6.8mm polymer case-metal cartridge) (US Army)
Textron CT System (Olin Winchester CT 6.8mm polymer-cased telescoped cartridge) (US Army)
FN-America HAMR  (Federal Cartridge Company 6.8mm cartridge) (US Army)
MRGG (Mid-Range Gas Gun) (6.5mm Creedmoor) (USSOCOM)
Mk 17 Mod 1 (FN SCAR-H) (6.5mm Creedmoor) (USSOCOM)
LMT MARS-H 6.5 DMR (6.5mm Creedmoor) (USSOCOM)
LaRue Tactical PredatOBR 6.5 Creedmoor (6.5mm Creedmoor) (USSOCOM)

Canceled experiments
XM8 rifle (Lightweight Assault Rifle system) - never issued) (5.56×45mm NATO) 
XM29 (Kinetic Energy and Airburst Launcher System; 5.56×45mm NATO and 20 mm airburst munition (XM1018)(early)/25 mm airburst munition) - experiment canceled
Advanced Combat Rifle program entries (concluded 1991)
Misc. Future Rifle Program entries (canceled)
Special Purpose Individual Weapon (SPIW) program entries  - concluded/canceled)

Carbines

In active service
M4A1 (5.56×45mm NATO)
XM7 (6.8 Common) (US Army)

In active service (some branches or limited roles)
M4 (5.56×45mm NATO) (the U.S. Army was upgrading and retrofitting their existing stock of M4 carbines to the specifications of the M4A1, starting in 2014 and was predicted to be completed by 2020)
Mk 18 Mod 0 CQBR (Close Quarters Battle Receiver) (5.56×45mm NATO) (USMC Recon, USCG, USN SEALs, USSOCOM, and USASOC)
M231 FPW (Firing Port Weapon) (5.56×45mm NATO) (US Army Bradley M2A3 Crew)
GAU-5A ASDW (Aircrew Self-Defence Weapon) (5.56x45mm NATO) (US Air Force)
Mk 16 Mod 0 (5.56x45mm NATO) (US Army Rangers)
SCAR-L (CQC, STD)(5.56x45mm NATO) (US Army Rangers, USSOCOM)
Heckler & Koch HK416 (5.56×45mm NATO) (USSOCOM)
Sig Sauer MCX Rattler conversion kit to M4A1 (5.56×45mm NATO and .300 AAC Blackout) (USSOCOM)

Out of service (obsolete)
Colt Model 723 (Carbine version of M16A2, 5.56×45mm NATO) (US Navy)
M4E2 Carbine (Automatic Carbine, 5.56×45mm NATO) (never standardized)
CAR-15 Survival Rifle (5.56×45mm)
Colt Model 653 (Carbine version of M16A1, 5.56×45mm NATO)
GAU-5/A and A/A ("SMG," 5.56×45mm)
XM177E1 and XM177E2 ("SMG," 5.56×45mm)
Colt Model 733 (5.56×45mm NATO) (USMC Force Recon)
XM23 Carbine (Selective Fire Carbine, 5.56×45mm NATO)
GUU-4/P ("Arm Gun," .221 Remington Fireball)
CAR-15 SMG (CAR-15 w/ 10" barrel, 5.56 mm)
CAR-15 Carbine (M16 w/ 15" barrel, 5.56×45mm)
AR-7  (.22 LR)
M1/M1A1 Carbine (Semi-Automatic Carbine, .30 Carbine)
M2 Carbine (Full-Automatic Carbine, .30 Carbine)
M3 Carbine ( Infrared Scoped, Full-Automatic Carbine, .30 Carbine)
Thompson Light Rifle (Full-Automatic Carbine, .30 Carbine)
M50 Reising
T38/M4 (Survival Rifle; .22 Hornet)
T39/M6 (Survival Rifle; .22 Hornet/.410 Gauge)
MA-1 (AR-5 Survival Rifle; .22 Hornet)
M1892/M1896/M1898/M1899 Carbine (a/k/a Krag Bolt Action Carbine; .30-40 Krag)
M1873/M1877/M1879/M1884/M1886 Carbine (.45-70 Gov.: .45-55-405 & .45-70-500)
Smith carbine (Breech-loader (break-open); .50-50-360)
Burnside carbine (Breech-loader, .58-60-500)
Starr Carbine (Breech-loader, .54)
Springfield Model 1863 (Breech-barrel carbine, .52-cal.)

Canceled experiments and competitions
Individual Carbine (US Army)
XM8 Compact Carbine (5.56×45mm) (never issued)

Shotguns

In active service
M500  (pump-action 12 Gauge)
M590  (pump-action 12 Gauge)
M590A1  (pump-action 12 Gauge)
Saiga-12 (USCG, various U.S. Military Police units)

In active service (some branches or limited roles)
M870 (pump-action 12 gauge) (USCG and USAF)
M1014  (semi-automatic 12 gauge)  (US Army and USMC)
M26 (Modular Accessory Shotgun System) (bolt-action 12 gauge attachment) (US Army)

Out of service/Canceled
Ithaca Model 37 (pump-action 12 gauge)
Pancor Jackhammer (gas-operated 12 gauge)
Remington 7188 (full-auto 12 gauge) (Navy SEALs)
Remington Model 10 (pump-action 12 gauge)
Remington Model 11 (semi-automatic 12 gauge)
Remington Model 31 (pump-action 12 gauge)
Springfield Model 1881 Forager (20 gauge)
Stevens Model 520-30 (pump-action 12 gauge)
Stevens Model 620 (pump-action 12 gauge)
Winchester 1200 (pump-action 12 gauge)
Winchester Model 1912 (pump-action 12 gauge)
Winchester Model 1897 (pump-action 12 gauge)
CAWS entrants, specifically HK CAWS

Experimental
Maxwell Atchisson AA-12 (semi-automatic/Full-automatic 12 gauge)  (USSOCOM, primarily USN SEALs)

Submachine guns

In active service (some branches or limited roles)
B&T APC9 Pro-K Sub Compact Weapon (SCW) (9x19mm) (Military Police, US Air Force)
Heckler & Koch MP5-N/MP5K-N/MP5SD-N (9×19mm) (USSOCOM)
Heckler & Koch MP7A1 (4.6×30mm) (DEVGRU, JSOC)
SIG Sauer MPX (9×19mm) (US Army, JSOC)
Colt RO635 SMG (9×19mm) (USMC)

Out of service (obsolete)
HK SMG II (9×19mm Parabellum) (never issued)
HK 54A1 (9×19mm Parabellum) (never issued)
HK MP2000 (9×19mm Parabellum) (never issued)
M3/M3A1 Grease Gun (.45 ACP/9×19mm Parabellum)
Madsen M50 (9×19mm Parabellum)
Walther MPL/MPK (9×19mm Parabellum)
Mk 24 Mod 0 (Smith & Wesson Model 76; 9×19mm Parabellum)
Carl Gustav M/45 (9×19mm Parabellum)
Model 50/55 Reising (.45 ACP)
M2 submachine gun (Hyde-Inland M2, .45 ACP)
M42 submachine gun (United Defense M42, .45 ACP/9×19mm Parabellum)
M1/M1A1 Thompson (.45 ACP)
M1928/M1928A1 Thompson (.45 ACP)
M1921 Thompson (.45 ACP) (not type classified)
Uzi/Mini Uzi (9×19mm Parabellum)

Machine guns

In active service
M249
Mk48 Mod 1 (USSOCOM)
M240 
M60
SIG MG 338  (USSOCOM)
M2 .50 caliber heavy machine gun

Experimental
Mk48 Mod 2
NGSW-AR
Knight's Armament Company LAMG
LSAT light machine gun
FN EVOLYS
XM250
LWMMG

Anti-tank/Assault

In active service
FGM-148 Javelin AAWS-M (Advanced Anti-Tank Weapon System-Medium) (127 mm)
FIM-92 Stinger MANPADS (Man-Portable Air-Defense System) (1.5 m)
M136 AT4 (Disposable Anti-Tank Weapon) (84 mm) (US Army, USMC and USAF)
M141 BDM (Bunker Defeat Munition) (83 mm) (US Army and USMC)
M202 FLASH (FLame Assault SHoulder Weapon) (66 mm Incendiary rockets) (US Army)
M203/A1/A2 Grenade launcher (40×46 mm)
M3 MAAWS (Multi-role Anti-armor Anti-tank Weapon System) (84 mm) (US Army)
Mk 153 Shoulder-Launched Multipurpose Assault Weapon (SMAW) (83.5 mm)
M72/A1/A2/A3/A4 LAW (Light Anti-Tank Weapon) (66 mm) (USMC and USAF)

In active service (some branches or limited roles)
M72A5/A6/A7/A8/A9/A10 LAW (Light Anti-Tank Weapon) (66 mm) (US Army)
M32 MGL (Multi-Shot Grenade Launcher) (40×46mm) (USMC)
M320 GLM (Grenade Launcher Module) (40×46mm) (US Army/ USMC)
Mk 13 Mod 0 EGLM (Enhanced Grenade Launching Module) (40×46mm) (USSOCOM, either paired with a Mk16 or 17 or as a stand-alone weapon system)
M79 Grenade launcher (40×46mm) (US Army Special Forces, USN SEALs)
AirTronic RPG-7 (USSOCOM)

Out of service (obsolete)
FGM-172 SRAW (Short-Range Assault Weapon) (140 mm) (USMC)
XM148 (Grenade launcher, 40×46mm)
M7 grenade launcher (Rifle grenade launcher attachment)
China Lake Grenade Launcher (Limited issue to special forces)
EX 41 grenade launcher (Pump-action 40mm grenade launcher)

Canceled experiments
XM25 CDTE (Counter Defilade Target Engagement) (25 mm LV airburst) (US Army) (Cancelled)

Mines

In active service
M18A1 Claymore Anti-Personnel mine
MM-1 Minimore Anti-Personnel mine
M15 Anti-Tank mine
M19 Anti-Tank mine
M21 Anti-Tank mine

Swords

In active service
Model 1840 Army Noncommissioned Officers' Sword A modern version of this sword with steel scabbard is currently permitted for wear by US Army platoon sergeants and first sergeants; in practice it is rarely seen outside the 3rd Infantry Regiment and honor guards.
Model 1852 Navy Officers' Sword
Model 1860 Navy CPO Cutlass (authorized only for ranks of Chief to Master Chief)
Model 1902 Army Officers' Sword
Coast Guard Officers' Sword
Marine Noncommissioned Officers' Sword, 1859–Present
Marine Officers' Mameluke Sword, 1825–present (discontinued shortly from 1859 to 1875) 
Air Force Academy Cadets' Sword, c. 1955–present
West Point Cadets' Sword, c. 1922–present

Out of service
Model 1832 Foot Artillery Sword
Model 1840 Light Artillery Saber
Model 1872 Mounted Artillery Officers' Saber
Model 1840 Army Musicians' Sword
Model 1812/13 Starr Cavalry Saber
Model 1818 Starr Cavalry Saber
Model 1833 Dragoon Saber
Model 1840 Heavy Cavalry Saber
Model 1860 Light Cavalry Saber
Model 1872 Light Cavalry Saber
Model 1906 Light Cavalry Saber
Model 1913 "Patton" Cavalry Saber
Model 1832 Army Foot Officers' Sword
Model 1832 Army General & Staff Officers' Sword
Model 1832 Army Medical Staff Officers' Sword
Model 1839 Army Topographical Engineer Officers' Sword
Model 1840 Army Foot Officers' Sword
Model 1840 Army General & Staff Officers' Sword
Model 1840 Army Medical Staff Officers' Sword
Model 1840 Army Pay Department Officers' Sword
Model 1840 Army Engineer Officers' Sword
Model 1850 Army Foot Officers' Sword
Model 1850 Army Staff & Field Officers' Sword
Model 1860 Army Field & Staff Officers' Sword
Model 1872 Army Line & Staff Officers' Sword
Model 1830 Navy Officers' Sword
Model 1841 Navy Officers' Sword
Model 1834 Revenue Cutter Service Officers' Sword
Model 1870 Revenue Cutter Service Officers' Sword
Model 1797 Starr Naval Cutlass
Model 1808 Starr Naval Cutlass
Mayweg & Nippes "Baltimore" Naval Cutlass, c. 1810
Model 1816 Starr Naval Cutlass
Model 1826 Starr Naval Cutlass
Model 1841 Naval Cutlass
Model 1861 Naval Cutlass
Model 1917 Naval Cutlass
Marine Noncommissioned Officers' Sword, c.1832–1859
Marine Officers' Mameluke Sword, 1826–59
West Point Cadets' Sword, Model 1872
West Point Cadets' Sword, c. 1837

See also
List of crew-served weapons of the U.S. Armed Forces
List of firearms
List of U.S. Army weapons by supply catalog designation
List of U.S. military vehicles by model number

References

Individual (United States Armed Forces)

Individual weapons